Purwokerto is a large but non-autonomous town on the island of Java, Indonesia. It is the coordinating centre of local government (Bakorwil 3) and the largest city in western Central Java. Currently, Purwokerto is the capital of Banyumas Regency, Central Java province. The population of the four districts which comprise the town at the 2010 census was 233,951 and 229,271 at the 2020 census; the official estimate as at mid 2021 was 230,235. The City is considered to be the most comfortable city in Indonesia, as it is the favourite place for pensionary to live after not working.

Geography
Purwokerto is located in the middle of Java Island within the province of Central Java, near the base of Mount Slamet, the second-tallest mountain in Java. The average elevation is 183,87 meters, maximum 286 m, and minimum 71 meters above sea level. The city is bisected by the Kali Kranji (Kranji River). It lies near two major east–west roads, Sudirman Street and Gatot Subroto Street.

Climate
Purwokerto has a tropical rainforest climate (Af) with moderate rainfall in July and August and heavy to very heavy rainfall in the remaining months.

History
The history of Purwokerto as the capital of the Banyumas Regency is intertwined with the history of Banyumas itself.  Banyumas was established in 1582 by Raden Joko Kahiman. He later became the first regent, Duke Mrapat.

The Sultanate of Pajang
Following the unintentional killing of Adipati Wirasaba VI in District Lowano (now Purworejo), Sultan Hadiwijaya summoned Joko Kahiman, the dead man's son in law. The Sultan made Kahiman "Adipati Wirasaba VII" (Regent of Wirasaba) and divided the Wirasaba regency into four parts. The Banjar region was given to Kyai Ngabei Wirayuda. The Meden territory was given to Kyai Ngabei Wirakusuma. The Wirasaba territory given to Kyai Ngabei Wargawijaya and the Kejawar territory was controlled by the Sultan himself. There, he cleared the Mangli forest and named the area "Banyumas". At that time, the capital of the Kejawar territory was in Banyumas. After the flood of 1861, the capital was moved to Purwokerto, which was located about 18 km further north.

Administrative of Purwokerto

Purwokerto is used to be administratively equal to an "Administrative City" and now has a special status as the capital of Banyumas Regency. And it also used to have a Major (Walikotatif). Purwokerto is now divided into four administrative districts (kecamatan), each headed by a "Camat".
The administrative municipalities of Purwokerto (and part of Banyumas Regency) follow:
 South Purwokerto (Purwokerto Selatan), is the most populous district with a population of 72,608 people in mid 2021. Bulupitu's bus station and Taman Andang Pangrenan are here.
 East Purwokerto (Purwokerto Timur), with a population of 54,815 people. Main street; Jl.Jendral Sudirman, includes the city's landscape Pendopo Kabupaten and aloon aloon.
 West Purwokerto (Purwokerto Barat), with a population of 53,024 people. Railway Station (Stasiun Besar Daop V Purwokerto) is here.
 North Purwokerto (Purwokerto Utara), with a population of 49,788 people. Bordered with main destination place "Baturraden district", many residences and Jendral Sudirman University (Unsoed) are here, including most of the culinary places in the town.

If Purwokerto again became an autonomous city, now that it has 230,235 people, it would cover 38.58 km2 with 11 municipalities (kecamatan).

Transport

Air
Purwokerto's nearest airport is the Tunggul Wulung airport in Cilacap township, approximately 40 km south of Purwokerto. Tunggul Wulung has direct flights (three times per week) from Halim Perdana Kusuma airport in Jakarta.  The travel time from Jakarta to Cilacap is 45 minutes. Lately in 2016 Wirasaba (PWL) is planned for commercial flight service. The distance to the town is about 15 km only. Many news sources state that this airport will be developed for commercial flight, while even Garuda Indonesia and Susi Air will be serving this route to Jakarta. Additionally, there is a new bridge that has been built by two regencies between Banyumas and Purbalingga, called Linggamas which supports it.

Railway
Purwokerto is a hub city connecting Cirebon to Jogjakarta. The train is one of the main modes of transport to Purwokerto. All classes of the ticket, from economy to first class, are available for trips on trains from Jakarta, Bandung, Yogyakarta, and Surabaya. The total journey from Jakarta is 6 hrs (first class) and 10 hrs (economy class). Soon in 2016, is being built double track between Purwokerto and Kroya for about 25 km the distance. It will be easier also faster the trip between two station above. Double track from Jakarta to Purwokerto now is fully serviced and it takes 5 hours only for single trip. There are 2 new destinations serviced by new train: 
 Kamandaka services the potential passengers from Purwokerto, Bumiayu, Tegal to Semarang Tawang. There are 3 times trip for a single day.
 Joglokerto services the passengers from Purwokerto to Jogjakarta and ended in Solo
 Since February 2016, especially Purwojaya Train is available serving in all executive class (K-1)

Road
Intercity buses connect Purwokerto to other cities on the island. The Purwokerto bus station is the third largest terminal in Central Java province after Terboyo (Semarang) and Tirtonadi (Surakarta). The Bulupitu's bus station services the passengers across the mainland to Bali/Lombok in the eastern also Banda Aceh (Sumatera) in the western. In 2016 will planned BRT system (Bus Rapid Transportation) serving between Purbalingga to Purwokerto. For more facilities now is built "Traffic Park" or Taman Lalu Lintas Bulupitu whereas becomes an education park for the public. This could be one of a little amount of additional bus station facilities in Indonesia. There is the first in Indonesia "Sleeper bus" serving Purbalingga/Purwokerto to Jakarta, which is a new facility where the beds are available inside and look just like a hotel's facility.

Cruising the roads in Purwokerto is challenging. The roads are not quite wide enough as ones in bigger cities, and there are still Becaks (rickshaw-like tricycles) using the same roads as motor vehicles. We will hardly ever see traffic jam here, but we will frequently bump into another car cruising the road very slowly or motorcyclists who ride in the middle of the road with low speed. It will need quite an effort for people coming from big city to adjust life on the road of Purwokerto. It is advisable to use bicycles instead.

Places of interest

Alun-alun
Purwokerto's central public square, has six banyan trees: a tree at each corner, and two in the center. The townsfolk often spend their leisure time in the shady square and it is a common place for children to play. Vendors in the square sell children's toys and local foods.
On one side is the regional government building, Kabupaten. On the west side of the square is the Masjid Baitus Salam Mosque of Purwokerto. To the east is the old cemetery on Ragasemangsang Road.

Bank BRI Museum

Located in the city center, Bank BRI Museum was built and dedicated to the Bank BRI's founder, R.A. Wiriatmadja. Formerly named as De Purwakertosche Hulp-en Spaar Bank der Inlandsche Bestuur Ambtenaren in 1895, now Bank BRI is one of the largest bank in the nation, as well as the oldest in the nation. Displays a lot of collections of coin and money from the VOC era until the present time.

Baturraden

Baturraden, located 15 km north of Purwokerto is an area of the typical highland country at the foot of the Gunung Slamet volcano. It is a popular site for local tourism, with a children's playground, hot springs, trekking and camping. There are two natural hot springs at Baturraden, namely Pancuran Telu and Pancuran Pitu. The campground is called Wana Wisata. Some hotels, villas and budget hotels are available in Baturraden.

Parks & Public facilities
 Taman Andang Pangrenan, replacing ex-old bus station, now is become a green park in the town
 Taman Bale Kemambang, another green park located in Jl.Karangkobar

Hotels Facilities

There are many hotels available in Purwokerto and Baturraden as follow :
 Aston Imperium (****) located in the strategic street between down town and Baturraden. Jl.Ovis/Dr.Angka/Suharso/Bunyamin with 12 floors.
 Java Heritage (****) located in Jl. Dr. Angka, now is the best one city resort hotel in town and it's still in renovation. Now is managed by local management and replaced to the new one "JAVA HERITAGE HOTEL" (***).

 Swisbell (****) is under construction and located in Rita Super Mall, is planned  20 floors.
 Santika (***) One of Kompas/Gramedia group, established from several years ago and become the pleasant place to stay in town (7 floors)
 Rossenda Cottage (****) located in Baturraden offering the mountain panorama.
 Atrium Resort (***) located in Jl Soepardjo Roestam Sokaraja
 Green Valley resort (***) located in northern Purwokerto, Baturraden
 Meotel (*) the new one hotel and it's opened July 2016

 Dominic (*) with 8 floors and service the good city panorama
 Wisata Niaga
 Borobudur
 M Griya
 Grand Whiz (plan)
 Ibis (plan)
 COR Hotel (u/c) at Sudirman, replaced from Indosat Gallery 7 floors
 Serela by Kagum 6 floors is U/C
And many more

Malls and Shopping Center 
Recently Purwokerto has a little shopping center in amount, but now is being built a new mall located in the southern of Alun-alun called RSM (Rita Super Mall) integrated with Swisbell Hotels **** and also soon is planned built PCC (Purwokerto City Center) where the location is ex Stasiun Timur (PJKA) a mix-used complex ; mall, hotel, shop houses.

It can be described for several years later list of shopping centers (with the established) follows:

Market 
 Pasar Wage is the biggest traditional and semi-modern market in town and becomes a famous destination  shopping for people of 5 regencies around
 Pasar Manis (now has been modernly renovated and officially published by President Mr. Jokowi a few months ago; #1 quarter of 2016), Pasar Kliwon, Pasar Pon etc. are traditional markets in town.

Mall 
 Moro Mall, after renovation comes with more stores and bigger parking building. 
 ACE Hardware and Informa, used to be Tamara Plaza, at Jl. Jenderal Sudirman.
 Kebon Dalem shopping complex whereas the oldest one with Matahari Dept. Store. In rumor lately, it will be re-built by a National Developer a new modern mall and condo-tel (coming soon Bondalem City 2 towers @ 20 floors with Amaris Hotel & Mall)

Rita 
 Rita Pasar Raya at Sudirman
 Rita Kebondalem
 Rita Sudirman Barat
 Rita Super Mall (RSM), which is planned to be integrated with Swisbell Hotel (****), the only modern mall in town so far; with the famous brands tenants, restaurants, cinema (CGV Blitz) etc.

Planned 
 Purwokerto City Center (PCC) is planned built on former East Purwokerto station area, a mix-used complex with mall includes new hotel and modern shop houses
 Golden Square (plan) Ex Lapangan PORKA
 Carrefour and Trans Mart are under planning.

Food
The Purwokerto local food includes mendoan (fermented soy bean covered in wheat flour dough and deep fried), ranjem, nopia and mino (small nopia), tempeh keripik and many different kinds of chips. Gethuk goreng, made of cassava and Javanese sugar is also available. It is sold by various shops under various names. Also, in the morning, one may find a serabi seller on almost every corner of town.
One Purwokerto delicacy is soto. It is also made in the nearby town of Sokaraja. Purwokerto soto is made from the chicken while that from Sokaraja contains beef. Both are different from other sotos in Indonesia, because they are mixed with a spicy nut sambal. The most famous soto sokaraja seller in Sokaraja is "Soto Kecik", near the Buddha's monastery.

Beside the local traditional culinary mentioned above, there are many franchise's restaurants; fast food especially has opened their branch here such as : KFC (now 2 outlets with 1 is Drive Thru and will open soon 2 new outlets in Rita Supermall and Moro).
Moro Mall has a food court where we can eat any menus available from traditional and modern culinary.
Bunto's Cafe locates in Jalan Sudirman where the international fast food with fully local taste is available too.
Along at the Soeharso street /GOR, there are so many restaurants and recently become as one of culinary destination in town beside at Jalan Bunyamin/Baturaden

Medical facilities

Purwokerto is a center for medical care for the southern part of the Central Java Province. There are both public and private hospitals for both general and specialist care. They include:
 RSUD Margono Soekarjo County Hospital (teaching hospital for Jenderal Soedirman University School of Medicine), includes also RS Geriatri Hospital as the specialty hospital (for gerontology) under the same management of RSUD Margono Soekarjo County Hospital
 RS Wijaya Kusuma (aka. DKT) Hospital
 RS Santa Elisabeth hospital
 RS Islam Hospital
 RS Hidayah Hospital
 RS Bunda Hospital
 RS Ananda Hospital
 RS Orthopedic Hospital (orthopaedics).
 Jenderal Soedirman University Dental Hospital
 RS Hermina Hospital (U/C)
The main state-run hospital is RSUD Margono Soekarjo County Hospital which is located on the eastern edge of Purwokerto. Its name is commonly shortened to "RS Margono Soekarjo". It was named after the first surgeon in Indonesia. The surgeon was born in Purwokerto and his grave is found in Pesarean Kebutuh, Sokaraja Kulon.

Since 2010, Purwokerto has also been known as the place offering plastic surgery services. It is believed that many celebrities come secretly to Purwokerto for plastic surgery instead of having it done in Jakarta. The plastic surgery services are provided by RSUD Margono Soekarjo County Hospital and RS Geriatri hospital.

Schools/Education

Jenderal Soedirman University is the main university in Purwokerto. It is located on the town's northern outskirts and south of the town for Faculty of Medicine. There are many universities and academies in Purwokerto which serve the southern part of central Java.
They include:
 Jenderal Soedirman University (UNSOED)
 Muhammadiyah Purwokerto University
 Amikom University of Purwokerto 
 Wijaya kusuma University
 Telkom Institute of Technology Purwokerto
 Universitas Islam Negeri Saifuddin Zuhri Purwokerto (UINSAIZU)
 Sekolah Tinggi Ilmu Komputer (STIKOM) Yos Sudarso Purwokerto
 Sekolah Tinggi Ilmu Ekonomi Purwokerto
 Sekolah Tinggi Ilmu Ekonomi Satria
 Sekolah Tinggi Manajemen Informatika & Komputer Widya Utama
 Sekolah Tinggi Teknik Wiworotomo
 Akademi Kebidanan YLPP
 Akademi Kesehatan Lingkungan
 Informatics and Computer Management Academy
 Akademi Pariwisata “Eka Sakti”
 Nursing Muhammadiyah Academy
 Pratama Politechnic

Notable people
 Tontowi Ahmad, badminton player
 Christian Hadinata, badminton player
 Fung Permadi, badminton player
 General Gatot Soebroto, an Army General and a National Hero during the Independence of Indonesia
 Saifuddin Zuhri, Minister of Religion in the era of Sukarno

See also
 Banyumas Regency
 General Sudirman Airport
 Tunggul Wulung Airport

References

External links

 

Populated places in Central Java
Regency seats of Central Java
Banyumas Regency